Jennings High School is a junior and senior high school (grades 7–12) in Jennings, Louisiana, United States. It is a part of Jefferson Davis Parish Public Schools.

 it has 880 students.

Athletics
Jennings High athletics competes in the LHSAA.

Championships
Football championships
(3) State Championships: 1908, 1939, 1992

Notable people
 Travis Etienne, NFL running back for the Jacksonville Jaguars
 Trevor Etienne, Running Back for the Florida Gators, younger brother of Travis.

References

External links
 Jennings High School
 

Schools in Jefferson Davis Parish, Louisiana
Public high schools in Louisiana
Public middle schools in Louisiana